The Twenty-Eighth Wisconsin Legislature convened from  to  in regular session.

Senators representing odd-numbered districts were newly elected for this session and were serving the first year of a two-year term. Assembly members were elected to a one-year term. Assembly members and odd-numbered senators were elected in the general election of November 3, 1874. Senators representing even-numbered districts were serving the second year of their two-year term, having been elected in the general election held on November 4, 1873.

Major events
 March 1, 1875: President Ulysses S. Grant signed the Civil Rights Act of 1875 into law.
 May 20, 1875: The Metre Convention was signed in Paris, establishing the International Bureau of Weights and Measures.
 November 2, 1875: Harrison Ludington elected Governor of Wisconsin.

Major legislation
 February 17, 1875: An Act to require the several railroad companies in this state to provide for the safety of passengers, 1875 Act 24.
 February 20, 1875: An Act to amend chapter 273, of the laws of 1874, entitled "An act relating to railroad, express and telegraph companies in the state of Wisconsin," 1875 Act 39. Replaced the three-person railroad commission with a single railroad commissioner.
 February 24, 1875: An Act to more fully define and punish the crime of bribery, committed at or before elections, 1875 Act 56.  Criminalized the buying or selling of votes.
 February 27, 1875: An Act to prevent the ensnaring or trapping of deer, 1875 Act 85.
 March 2, 1875: An Act to render women eligible to local school offices, 1875 Act 120.
 March 2, 1875: An Act to encourage the invention and successful use of steam or other mechanical agents on highways, 1875 Act 134. Created a $10,000 bounty for invention of a steam-powered substitute for horses for transportation or farm labor.
 March 3, 1875: An Act to prevent and punish cruelty to animals, 1875 Act 150.

Party summary

Senate summary

Assembly summary

Sessions
 1st Regular session: January 13, 1875March 6, 1875

Leaders

Senate leadership
 President of the Senate: Charles D. Parker (D)
 President pro tempore: Henry D. Barron (R)

Assembly leadership
 Speaker of the Assembly: Frederick W. Horn (IR)

Members

Members of the Senate
Members of the Senate for the Twenty-Eighth Wisconsin Legislature:

Members of the Assembly
Members of the Assembly for the Twenty-Eighth Wisconsin Legislature:

Employees

Senate employees
 Chief Clerk: Fred A. Dennett
 Assistant Clerk: Thomas B. Reid
 Bookkeeper: Thomas St. George
 Engrossing Clerk: Wilbur Dodge
 Enrolling Clerk: James F. Spencer
 Transcribing Clerk: Fred Heineman
 Clerk for the Committee on Engrossed Bills: T. K. Dunn
 Clerk for the Committee on Enrolled Bills: E. J. Cole
 Clerk for the Committee on Claims: Thomas A. Dyson
 Clerk for the Committee on Railroads: J. F. Johnston
 Clerk for the Committee on Judiciary: A. P. Carman
 Sergeant-at-Arms: O. U. Akin
 Assistant Sergeant-at-Arms: Charles G. Fay
 Postmaster: Amaziah Strang
 Assistant Postmaster: John L. Quimby
 Doorkeeper: William R. Kent
 Assistant Doorkeeper: William F. Bingman
 Assistant Doorkeeper: H. H. Field
 Gallery Doorkeeper: Charles Early
 Gallery Doorkeeper: T. H. Hansen
 Committee Room Attendant: Charles Scott
 Night Watch: H. H. Grace
 Porter: Michael Lynch
 Messengers:
 Glennie C. Richarson
 Waldo B. Stone
 W. W. Paine
 Harry R. Clise
 Harry Cuttler
 Arthur A. Hills
 G. Herbert Campbell
 William Kleinpell
 Nelson C. Brownell

Assembly employees
 Chief Clerk: Rollin M. Strong
 Assistant Clerk: C. D. Long
 Bookkeeper: R. A. Gillett
 Engrossing Clerk: Mrs. Fannie Vilas
 Enrolling Clerk: Julius Lasche
 Transcribing Clerk: W. M. Fogo
 Clerk for the Committee on Engrossed Bills: C. H. Boynton
 Clerk for the Committee on Enrolled Bills: Jonathan C. Sherwin Jr.
 Clerk for the Committee on Judiciary: J. B. Stocking
 Sergeant-at-Arms: John W. Brackett
 Assistant Sergeant-at-Arms: Miles Burnham
 Postmaster: P. J. Clawson
 Assistant Postmaster: George H. Osgood
 Doorkeepers: 
 J. F. Tinker
 N. F. Pierce
 C. A. Sellers
 Joseph Goss
 Night Watch: A. L. Lund
 Fireman: J. A. Nevill
 Committee Room Attendants:
 W. H. Bell
 J. W. Grange
 L. Woodward
 Gallery Attendants:
 W. L. Morrison
 George L. Cain
 Porter: F. O. Byrne
 Speaker's Messenger: L. E. Knox
 Chief Clerk's Messenger: Rufus Jenkins
 Sergeant-at-Arms' Messenger: W. Kanouse
 Messengers:
 Willie Horn
 Ben C. Baker
 Charles Keogh
 Willie Devine
 Willie Storm
 Charles Rothe
 Lucius Cannon
 John Bruce
 William Gallagher
 Joseph Parrish
 Theodore Kupper
 Marcus Moody

References

External links
 1875: Related Documents from Wisconsin Legislature

1875 in Wisconsin
Wisconsin
Wisconsin legislative sessions